Tobias Achim Feisthammel (born 22 February 1988) is a German footballer currently playing for SV Breuningsweiler.

References

External links
 
 
 Tobias Feisthammel at FuPa

1988 births
Living people
People from Reutlingen
Sportspeople from Tübingen (region)
German footballers
Association football defenders
Alemannia Aachen players
MSV Duisburg players
SC Paderborn 07 players
VfB Stuttgart II players
SV Elversberg players
Stuttgarter Kickers players
2. Bundesliga players
3. Liga players
Regionalliga players
Footballers from Baden-Württemberg